Casoli a comune and town in the Province of Chieti in the Abruzzo region of Italy. It is situated on a foothill of the Majella mountain, at the base of which runs the Aventino River, tributary of the Sangro.

Casoli borders the following municipalities: Altino, Civitella Messer Raimondo, Gessopalena, Guardiagrele, Palombaro, Roccascalegna, Sant'Eusanio del Sangro.

History
It was the ancient settlement of Cluviae, a city of the Caraceni tribe that was the territory most probably conquered by Lombards in the 6th century.
The medieval name "castri de Casule" was first recorded in 878 AD in the Memoriatorium abbatis Berthari, a manuscript conserved in the Abbey of Monte Cassino.

The village was controlled, in the fourteenth century by the Orsini family, who fortified the Norman castle. Casoli became famous as part cultirale in the nineteenth century, when the Mayor Pasquale Masciantonio housed in the castle the poet Gabriele d'Annunzio. In World War II, Casoli did not suffer severe bombing, because it was declared a "free city" for the displaced.

Main sights 
Castello Masciantonio: Norman castle of the eleventh century, with a tower and fortified ducal palace, which houses a museum. The room that housed Gabriele d'Annunzio is of particular interest for a dithyramb written by d'Annunzio on the wall, in thanks.
Church of Santa Maria Maggiore: It was one of the Orsini chapel (14th century), and later in the seventeenth century it became a real church. It has a rectangular plan, with a side porch, Baroque mold.

Demographic evolution

Gallery

Sister cities
  Canning, Western Australia, Australia

See also
Casoli internment camp
Castello Masciantonio

References

 
Cities and towns in Abruzzo
Samnite cities